Chase–Hyde Farm is a historic property located at 1281-1291 New Boston Road in Fall River, Massachusetts. The two-story main house with a mansard roof was built in 1879 for Abraham & Abby Chase. By 1893 the property was owned by Samuel Hyde, who operated a stock farm here. Hyde added the two outbuildings in the 1890s and may also be responsible for the c.1900 porch and porte-cochere. The property is surrounded by a rugged fieldstone wall capped with local Fall River granite. It was added to the National Register of Historic Places in 1983.

See also
National Register of Historic Places listings in Fall River, Massachusetts

References

Buildings and structures in Fall River, Massachusetts
Farms on the National Register of Historic Places in Massachusetts
National Register of Historic Places in Fall River, Massachusetts